The following is a list of the IRMA's number-one singles of 1997. The dates shown below are Sundays.

See also 
 1997 in music
 List of artists who reached number one in Ireland

1997 in Irish music
1997 record charts
1997